Hadass (Hebrew: הדס, pl. hadassim - הדסים) is a branch of the myrtle tree that forms part of the lulav used on the Jewish holiday of Sukkot.

Hadass is one of the Four species (arba'ah minim–ארבעת המינים). The others are the lulav (palm frond), aravah (willow), and etrog (citron). Three hadassim are incorporated into the Four Species and are bound together with the lulav and aravah. Together with the etrog, the lulav is waved in all four directions, plus up and down, to attest to God's mastery over all creation, and to voice a prayer for adequate rainfall over all the Earth's vegetation in the coming year.

The hadass grows in tiers of three leaves. According to the Halakha, the most perfect hadass is one whose leaves grow evenly in each set of three.

References

Kitov, Eliyahu (1978). The Book of Our Heritage. Jerusalem: Feldheim Publishers. .

Sukkot
Four species (Sukkot)
Jewish ritual objects
Myrtus
Hebrew words and phrases in Jewish law

he:הדס#ההדס בארבעת המינים